Phleger Dome is a massive dome-shaped mountain, 3,315 m, at the northeast end of Stanford Plateau along the Watson Escarpment. Mapped by United States Geological Survey (USGS) from ground surveys and U.S. Navy air photos, 1960–63. Named by Advisory Committee on Antarctic Names (US-ACAN) for Herman Phleger, one of the U.S. representatives in the discussions on the Antarctic Treaty of 1959.

Mountains of Marie Byrd Land